Caheravoley Fort is a ringfort (rath) and bawn forming a National Monument located in County Galway, Ireland.

Location

History
Caheravoley was built in the early Christian era. It was used as a protected farmstead, as indicated by the name: cathair dhá bhuaile, "circular fort of two milking-places." Cattle were grazed on the surrounding land, then brought into the fort for milking and to protect from thieves.

Description
A round ringfort with protective ditch and souterrain, with an entrance in the north end.

References

Archaeological sites in County Galway
National Monuments in County Galway